Yuman is a former Maidu settlement in Butte County, California. It lay at an elevation of 171 feet (52 m).  Its location is currently within the city limits of Oroville.

References

External links

Former settlements in Butte County, California
Former Native American populated places in California
Lost Native American populated places in the United States
Maidu villages